Adam Gregory Stevens (born July 22, 1978) is a NASCAR Cup Series crew chief for Christopher Bell. In 2015, he became the first crew chief since Jeff Hammond in 1982 to win the championship in his rookie season.

Early life
Stevens caught the racing bug at a tender, young age from his father Greg Stevens, who raced dune buggies and dirt late model cars. Together, they would go to a nearby race shop with any spare time that they had and they would tinker. Stevens raced at Skyline Speedway in Stewart, Ohio and other dirt tracks in his home state throughout high school and college. In 1999 Stevens raced in one of the biggest dirt Late Model races in the country – The Dirt Late Model Dream at Eldora Speedway in Rossburg, Ohio. Stevens attended Ohio University on his way to earning his bachelor's degree in mechanical engineering in 2002. After realizing during his college years that a driving career wasn’t for him, Stevens headed south during the summer break from school to the heart of the NASCAR industry, Charlotte, North Carolina. There, he would go door-to-door, handing out resumes at race shops with hope of landing a job with a NASCAR team upon graduation.

NASCAR career
After graduating from Ohio University in the spring of 2002 with his mechanical engineering degree in hand, Stevens’ persistence paid off in August when he landed his first job in NASCAR with Petty Enterprises as a designer. Stevens worked at Petty Enterprises for three years when the man that hired him there came calling again in 2005. That season, Joe Gibbs Racing (JGR) was undergoing an expansion from a two-car team with the Nos. 18 and 20 cars to a third team with the No. 11 car with Jason Leffler. It was looking for race engineers, where he landed with the No. 20 car driven by former JGR driver Tony Stewart and crew chief Greg Zipadelli. After serving as race engineer with Zipadelli and Stewart from 2005 to 2008 – a stint that included 18 wins and a Sprint Cup championship in 2005, Stewart left the team after the 2008 season to become a team owner at Stewart-Haas Racing.
This gave Stevens the opportunity to work with rookie driver Joey Logano as his team engineer, with Zipadelli remaining
as crew chief for the 2009 and 2010 seasons.

Another big break would come for Stevens at the end of the 2010 season as the JGR Nationwide Series shop underwent an expansion from two to three cars. Stevens was named crew chief in January 2011 for JGR’s new No. 20 Xfinity team, for which Logano was the primary driver with a few others taking turns behind the wheel throughout like Denny Hamlin, Michael McDowell and others. While Stevens and Logano got off to a slow start in 2011, recording just one win, they reeled off nine wins the following year in 2012. But change was on the horizon at JGR once again the following year. Matt Kenseth joined in 2013 to drive the No. 20 Sprint Cup Toyota while Logano moved to the No. 22 team at Penske Racing, setting up another crew chief change for the JGR Xfinity program. Busch had raced for his own Kyle Busch Motorsports team in a select number of
Xfinity races in 2012 but decided to move his No. 54 ride back to JGR starting in 2013. With the move, JGR decided to pair Stevens with Busch, who is the all-time leader in Xfinity Series wins. It paid dividends right away as the pair combined for 19 wins, 46 top-five finishes, and 47 top-10s in 52 total Xfinity starts together in 2013 and 2014 which included 25 top-5s in 26 starts in 2014. In 2015, Stevens was paired off with Kyle Busch in the Cup Series and won the title in their first try.

It was announced at the end of the 2020 season that Stevens and Busch would no longer be paired with each other and that Stevens would crew-chief the No. 20 car, driven by Christopher Bell.

Personal life
Stevens resides in the Charlotte area with his wife Aubrey and his sons Carter and Ryan.

References

External links
 

Living people
1978 births
NASCAR crew chiefs
Sportspeople from Ohio
People from Portsmouth, Ohio
People from Huntersville, North Carolina